The Maryland Correctional Institution - Hagerstown is a medium-security state prison for men located in Hagerstown, Washington  County, Maryland.  First opened in 1942 as the Maryland State Penal Farm, it was expanded and assumed its current name in 1964.  It has a maximum capacity of 2179 inmates.

References

Prisons in Maryland
Buildings and structures in Washington County, Maryland
1942 establishments in Maryland